Piero Pacini da Pescia (flourished 1495–1514) was an Italian publisher. He lived and worked in Florence, Italy. Pacini made operettes. His publishing house was known for publishing quality woodcuts in their books. After his death, his son, Bernardo, continued the business. Works by Pacini are held in the collection of the Metropolitan Museum of Art and the Library of Congress.

His printer's mark can be found as a decoration on the Albert Kahn designed Muskegon Chronicle building in Muskegon, Michigan, USA.  It was sculpted by Corrado Parducci.

Notable works

Epistole et Euangelii et Lectioni vulgari in lingua toschana, 1495
Aesop's Fables, 1496
Triumphs of Petrarch, 1499
The Letters of Amerigo Vespucci, 1505

References

Italian book publishers (people)
16th-century people of the Republic of Florence
Businesspeople from Florence